Jantzen Stuart Derrick (born 10 January 1943) is an English former professional footballer who played as a forward and winger.

Career 
Derrick started his career with Bristol City, playing 259 matches and scoring 31 goals. He spent the 1970–71 season on loan to Mansfield Town. In 1971, Derrick joined Paris Saint-Germain; he would go on to play three matches for them before heading to Bath City, where he would put an end to his career in 1975.

Personal life 
Jantzen Derrick was born in Bristol on 10 January 1943.

Later in his life, he would work as a van vendor in Bristol.

References

Sources

Bibliography

External links 
 

1943 births
Living people
English footballers
Footballers from Bristol
Association football forwards
Bristol City F.C. players
Mansfield Town F.C. players
Paris Saint-Germain F.C. players
Bath City F.C. players
English Football League players
Ligue 1 players
English expatriate footballers
Expatriate footballers in France
English expatriate sportspeople in France